The Product III: State of Emergency (stylized as The Product III: stateofEMERGEncy) is the third studio album by American singer and songwriter August Alsina. It was released on June 26, 2020, through his own label Shake the World and distributed by Empire. Production was handled by several record producers, including The Exclusives, Cardiak and DJ Mustard. It features guest appearances from Darrel Walls, Juicy J, Lil Wayne, Tink and Yo Gotti. The album was anticipated by the lead single "Today", the second official single "NOLA", and four promotional singles

The Product III: State of Emergency marks his first release since 2015's This Thing Called Life, also serving as the third installment in his "Product" mixtape series, which began in 2012. The sequel, The Product II, followed in 2013. The album is an R&B
and hip hop record that lyrically revolves around the struggle that the singer faced throughout his lifetime.

The album debuted at number 48 on the US Billboard 200, and at number 4 on the US Independent Albums chart. The Product III: State of Emergency was met with mixed reviews from music critics, that praised its personal songwriting but criticized its production.

Background and release
In July 2019, the singer shared that he'd been privately battling health issues and had momentarily lost the ability to walk. "I have a liver disease where my autoimmune system is fighting against itself" August Alsina said. "Reality is I'm sick all the time. I'd really like to talk about it and I'm not looking for anybody's sympathy. Don't treat me like I'm a f*cking cancer patient, because I'm not."

The singer has shared bits of his recovery via social media, and fans speculated a return for his music after his recovery ended. Alsina has given his listeners brief snippets of music through videos and Instagram stories over 2019, and on June 26, 2020 he announced that he was set to drop his forthcoming project The Product III: State of Emergency the next Friday.

The singer announced that the choice to make The Product III: State of Emergency a 27-track album came from the fact that it was inspired by Chris Brown's acclaimed 2017 album Heartbreak on a Full Moon, that inspired his third body of work for its length and for what the singer described as "the most honest and open songwriting possible". The singer announced that the album highlights "the struggle in my life, my upbringing as a crack baby, losing my father and sister, and becoming the guardian for my three nieces", as well as his battle with the auto-immune disease that affected him.

In describing the album, Alsina said,

Critical response

Upon its release, the album was met with mixed reviews from music critics. Andy Kellman of AllMusic complimented its personal songwriting but found the production to be "repetitive" and "flat", he stated "Alsina might do well to be as bold with production choices as he is with his songwriting. He has been a sympathetic artist since his debut, but this contains some of his bravest lyrics yet" Cultural critic and media personality Joe Budden praised some of the songs but was dismissive of its length, saying in his review for Complex: "The album has his fair piece of good songs. But this is not Chris Brown, where your talents allow your forty-songs-project to be great from start to bottom. This album is just too ambitious for August Alsina".

Track listing 
Credits adapted from Tidal.

Notes
 "Soon As I Walk In" is a remix of "Soon As U Walk In" performed by Tink.

Charts

References 

2020 albums
August Alsina albums
Albums produced by DJ Mustard
Empire Distribution albums
Sequel albums